ADB-BINACA is a cannabinoid designer drug that has been found as an ingredient in some synthetic cannabis products. It was originally developed by Pfizer as a potential analgesic, and is a potent agonist of the CB1 receptor with a binding affinity (Ki) of 0.33 nM and an EC50 of 14.7 nM.

ADB-BUTINACA 

The analogue with a 1-butyl substitution on the indazole ring rather than 1-benzyl has also been sold as a designer drug under the name ADB-BINACA, but is now more commonly referred to as ADB-BUTINACA to avoid confusion with the benzyl compound. It is a similarly potent CB1 agonist, with an EC50 of 6.36 nM.

See also 
 4F-ADB
 5F-AB-PINACA
 5F-ADB
 5F-ADB-PINACA
 ADB-CHMINACA
 ADB-FUBICA
 ADB-FUBINACA
 ADB-HEXINACA
 ADB-PINACA
 ADB-4en-PINACA

References 

Cannabinoids
Designer drugs

Indazolecarboxamides
Tert-butyl compounds